Unirea Shopping Center is a chain of two large shopping centres, the initial one being located in Unirii Square, Bucharest, Romania, and the second one in Brașov.

Bucharest

Opened in 1976 and enlarged in 1989, it was the largest department store in Communist Romania. It was converted into a shopping centre during the 1990s. The closest metro station to the shopping centre is Piața Unirii metro station.

Critical reception
In recent years many empty spaces have appeared in the Unirea shopping centre in Bucharest where once main-street and many less well known brands had their outlets. The state of the building has deteriorated gravely, which may lead to more vacancies in the near future. For occasional Romanian clients and foreign tourists it seems already to be clear that when the owner of the building does not invest in redevelopment (e.g., by reduction of shop floor capacity and modernisation, combined with creation of office space at the top floors of the building), this unique Bucharest landmark mall, despite its magnificent location and history, may lose its attraction completely, and could remain only an interesting outer hull for advertisement purposes mainly. In 2020 only some specialised clothing shops attract seemingly sufficient attention from the greater Bucharest region, worth paying a visit.

Developments in 2021
In January 2021 two outlets of the Inditex group (Bershka and Pull&Bear) were closed as a result of the COVID-19 pandemic, leaving the once attractive façade of the building partially crippled and shop windows at the north side of the building empty and less attractive. The food court on the top fourth floor was also closed, and most of the remaining shops on the third floor (with one exception) were closed as well, or were relocated to empty space on the second floor. In the basement, only the Mega Image grocery store  remains open as of September 2021. On the third and second floor many of the fire exits have been permanently locked, which constitutes a serious health risk in case of a fire in the building.

Unirea Shopping Center Brașov
The owner opened a second shopping centre in 2008 in Brașov,  Unirea Shopping Center Brașov, covering  on four levels and one underground, with ground and underground parking on three levels. 90% of the brands are present in the Bucharest complex too. Total value of the investment is estimated at 35 million euro.

In 2019 the Brașov shopping center, once very favorite for its location near to the railway station, seems to have lost the battle with recently developed malls elsewhere in the city, since it is almost empty, as if in a state waiting for permanent closure.

References

External links
Official website 

Shopping malls in Bucharest
Shopping malls established in 1976